Mika Godts (born 7 July 2005) is a Belgian footballer who plays for Jong Ajax as an attacker in the Eerste Divisie.

Early life
From Leuven, Godts was initially a youth player at Anderlecht before signing with Genk in 2020. He also represented Belgium at under-17 level for the first time in 2020.

Career

Genk
During the 2022-23 season Godts played 19 times for Jong Genk in the Challenger Pro League scoring 7 goals. Godts signalled he had no intention to sign a new contract with the club as he approached a contract expiry date of June 2023.

Ajax
On 31 January, 2023 Godts signed for Ajax on a two-and-a-half year contract. Ajax paid €1million with a sell-on clause reported to have been negotiated. Godts made a goal-scoring debut for Jong Ajax on 20 February, 2023 in a 4-2 home against MVV Maastricht.

Style of play
Godts is described as a left sided winger who can also play centrally, He has drawn comparisons with Belgian former international Eden Hazard.

References

External links

Living people
2005 births
Belgian footballers
R.S.C. Anderlecht players
K.R.C. Genk players
Jong Ajax players
Eerste Divisie players
Belgian expatriate footballers
Expatriate footballers in the Netherlands
Belgian expatriate sportspeople in the Netherlands